The National Planning Commission of South Africa is a South African government agency established in May 2010, responsible for strategic planning for the country.

The head of the commission reports to the President, and works with various ministries to co-ordinate joint priority projects that require a multifaceted approach. Trevor Manuel was appointed the first head of the commission by President Jacob Zuma. The commission is chaired by the Minister in the Presidency, heading a panel of "external experts". To avoid turf wars, it will not include Ministers.

In June 2014, then Deputy President, Cyril Ramaphosa, was appointed as the Chairman of the Commission with Minister in the Presidency Jeff Radebe as his deputy.

In December 2021, a third National Planning Commission for the period 2021-2026 was established, with Minister in the Presidency, Mondli Gungubele, appointed as Chairperson.

Mandates 
 Lead the development of a strategy for a post Covid-19 economy and society to deal with the country’s triple challenge of poverty, unemployment and inequality by 2030. 
 Support strong leadership that will be required to mobilize society to promote the acceleration in implementing the National Development Plan (NDP) towards 2030.
 Assist in forging a conversation among key stakeholders, leading to effective and impactful social compacts on a number of key issues facing the country.
 Advise on key issues such as food security, water security, energy choices, economic development, the economy’s structure, social cohesion, education, health, 4IR, public transport, industrial development, spatial planning and climate change.
 Undertake research and building a body of evidence on critical matters for long term planning and development of South Africa. Strengthen the use of evidence and the quality of empirical data, generated from impact assessments for national planning.
 Monitor, review and assess progress in achieving the NDP.
 Provide evidence-based advice on futuristic national planning and foresight scenario planning to implement the plan towards 2030 better.
 Contribute to the development of international partnerships and networks on national planning.

References

External links

Government departments of South Africa
Government agencies of South Africa